Pseudocercospora arecacearum is a fungus.

See also 
 Pseudocercospora gunnerae
 Pseudocercospora pandoreae

References 

arecacearum
Fungal plant pathogens and diseases